Anna Rybaczewski  (born 23 March 1982) is a French female former volleyball player, playing as a right side hitter. She was part of the France women's national volleyball team.

She competed at the 2013 Women's European Volleyball Championship. On club level she played for ASPTT Mulhouse.

References

External links
 
http://www.gettyimages.com/detail/news-photo/anna-rybaczewski-and-christina-bauer-of-france-fight-for-a-news-photo/91190060#anna-rybaczewski-and-christina-bauer-of-france-fight-for-a-ball-with-picture-id91190060
https://www.youtube.com/watch?v=I9ry8ss6rkU

1982 births
Living people
French people of Polish descent
French women's volleyball players
Place of birth missing (living people)